Diana Maria Lixăndroiu (born 14 August 2005) is a Romanian handball player who plays for CSM Slatina and the Romania national team. 

She represented Romania at the 2022 European Championship.

References
 

2005 births
Living people 
Romanian female handball players
Sportspeople from Slatina, Romania